Berglind is an Icelandic female given name. It started to be used in the 1930s and 1940s.

Notable people
Notable people with this given name include:
 Berglind Ásgeirsdóttir (born 1955), Icelandic politician

See also
 Berglind (surname), a Swedish surname

References